Ouled Khoudir is a town and commune in Ouled Khoudir District, Béchar Province, in western Algeria. According to the 2008 census its population is 4,251, up from 3,893 in 1998, with an annual growth rate of 0.9%.

Geography

Climate

Ouled Khoudir has a hot desert climate (Köppen climate classification BWh), with extremely hot summers and cool winters, and very little precipitation throughout the year.

Economy

Agriculture is the main industry in Ouled Khoudir. There are a total of 130,700 date palms planted in the commune. As of 2009 there were 1,935 sheep, 843 goats, 198 camels, and 12 cattle. There were also 1800 chickens in 1 building.

Transportation

Infrastructure and housing

95% of Ouled Khoudir's population is connected to drinking water, 95% is connected to the sewerage system, and 99% (including 1,071 buildings) have access to electricity. There are no fuel service stations in the town; the nearest is in Kerzaz.

Ouled Khoudir has a total of 991 houses, of which 493 are occupied, giving an occupation rate of 8.6 inhabitants per occupied building, the second highest in the province after the neighbouring town of Timoudi.

Education

There are 3 elementary schools, with 30 classrooms including 24 in use. There are a total of 964 school students.

4.8% of the population has a tertiary education, and another 16.2% has competed secondary education. The overall literacy rate is 74.0%, and is 85.4% among males and 62.9% among females.

Health

Ouled Khoudir has one polyclinic, 5 room care facilities, and a maternity ward. The nearest hospital is in Béni Abbès.

Religion

Ouled Khoudir has 5 operational mosques, with another 1 under construction.

Localities
The commune is composed of five localities:

Ouled Khodir
Ouled Rafaa
El Ksar
El Khabaïb
Meslila

References

Neighbouring towns and cities

Communes of Béchar Province
Cities in Algeria
Algeria